The 1941 Milan–San Remo was the 34th edition of the Milan–San Remo cycle race and was held on 19 March 1938. The race started in Milan and finished in San Remo. The race was won by Pierino Favalli of the  team.

General classification

References

Milan–San Remo
1941 in road cycling
1941 in Italian sport